This is a list of river cruise ships, both those in service and those that have since ceased to operate. As some river cruise ships have operated under multiple names, all names will be listed in the "Notes" section.

See also
 List of cruise ships

References

External links

River